Identityism is  the school of Sufi metaphysics of unity of being traditionally known as Wahdat al-Wujud or Wahdat ul-Wujood (Arabic: Literally, unity of existence) formulated by Ibn Arabi. Identityism is similar to monism in the west and nondualism and advaita vedanta in Hinduism.

See also 

 Sufi metaphysics
 Sufi philosophy

References

Sufi philosophy
Metaphysical theories